Jarno Janssen (born 19 September 2000) is a Dutch football player. He plays for FC Eindhoven.

Club career
He made his Eerste Divisie debut for FC Eindhoven on 24 August 2018 in a game against Go Ahead Eagles, as a 79th-minute substitute for Charni Ekangamene.

References

External links
 
 Career stats & Profile - Voetbal International

2000 births
Footballers from Eindhoven
Living people
Dutch footballers
Association football defenders
FC Eindhoven players
Eerste Divisie players